is the fourteenth single by Japanese girl group Melon Kinenbi. It was released on February 9, 2005, and its highest position on the Oricon weekly chart was #21. This was the last of Melon Kinenbi's singles to be produced by Tsunku, before fellow Sharam Q member Taisei took over.

Track listing

External links
Nikutai wa Shōjiki na Eros at the Up-Front Works release list (Japanese)

2005 singles
Zetima Records singles
Song recordings produced by Tsunku
Dance-pop songs
2005 songs
Song articles with missing songwriters